Pakke-Kessang (Vidhan Sabha constituency) is one of the 60 assembly constituencies of  Arunachal Pradesh a north east state of India. Pakke-Kessang is part of Arunachal East Lok Sabha constituency.

Members of Legislative Assembly
 1990: Dera Natung, Indian National Congress
 1995: Dera Natung, Indian National Congress
 1999: Dera Natung, Indian National Congress
 2004: Techi Hemu, Bharatiya Janata Party
 2009: Atum Welly, Indian National Congress
 2014: Kameng Dolo, Indian National Congress - terminated by ECI
 2017: Biyuram Wahge, Bharatiya Janata Party (By Poll)

Election results

2019

2017 by-election

See also
 Pakke-Kessang district
 List of constituencies of Arunachal Pradesh Legislative Assembly

References

Assembly constituencies of Arunachal Pradesh
East Kameng district